Mark McLinden (born 8 July 1979) is an Australian former professional rugby footballer of the 1990s and 2000s. He played rugby league in the NRL for Australian club, the Canberra Raiders and in the Super League for English club the London Broncos/Harlequins RL, which he also captained. A Country New South Wales representative backline player, McLinden finished his career in 2009 with a few rugby union games for the Queensland Reds in Super Rugby.

Early years
McLinden was born in Canberra, ACT, and played his early rugby at West Belconnen Warriors in the Canberra District Junior Rugby League. While attending Hawker College, McLinden played for the Australian Schoolboys team in 1996 and 1997.

Rugby league career
In 1998, McLinden signed to play in the NRL for his local team Canberra Raiders. Following an impressive début season, Mark was named NRL Rookie of the Year, and later won the Raiders' player of the year award.

He also received representative honours with selection for the Australian Junior Kangaroos squad to play tests against the Junior Kiwis. In 2001 McLinden was selected to play in the City vs Country Origin for Country. During his seven seasons at the Canberra Raiders, McLinden made 165 appearances, featuring in five play-off series.

Super League

McLinden signed for the London Broncos in November 2004 and was appointed team captain following on from Jim Dymock.

In 2006's Super League XI, with his club now operating as the Harlequins RL, Mark was the club's leading Super League try scorer with 14 tries from 17 appearances. His season was, however, disrupted by a persistent back injury which required an operation in late 2006.

The 2007 Super League XII saw McLinden return from injury. However, he was replaced as captain by England international Rob Purdham.

McLinden signed a three-year extension to his contract to keep him at Harlequins until the end of the 2009 season. However, in 2008 he suffered from a long debilitating illness which caused him to lose a lot of weight. As a result, he barely featured in Super League and he was released at the end of the year.

Before his switch to rugby union he was asked to play for the Ireland national rugby league team at the 2008 World Cup, but declined in favour of Super 14 pre-season training.

Rugby union career
McLinden played rugby union for the Queensland Reds in 2009. He scored his first Super 14 try in his side's 22-3 win over South Africa's Cheetahs at Suncorp Stadium. Just before the 2009/10 Super 14 season he retired from the game due to medical advice.

Later life
McLinden is a co-director of Animalates, an exercise program for children aged 4–11, combining Pilates, yoga, aerobics and dance with an animal characters theme.

McLinden was arrested for a pitch invasion at the 2022 NRL Grand Final. He entered the field wearing a shirt with "end coal, gas & oil" on the front and "for our kids" on the back, in protest against Government inaction to prevent climate change. McLinden was fined $5000 and banned from future NRL games.

References

Video Links
BBC Video

External links
"My life in rugby league: Mark McLinden" interview at TotalRL.com
Quins RL profile
Life with London
Triple drama for Harlequins squad

1979 births
Living people
Australian people of Irish descent
Australian rugby league players
Australian rugby union players
Canberra Raiders players
Country New South Wales Origin rugby league team players
London Broncos captains
London Broncos players
Queensland Reds players
Rugby league halfbacks